The Queen's Personal Barbadian Flag was the personal standard of Queen Elizabeth II, in her role as Queen of Barbados for use while in Barbados. It was first used when the Queen visited Barbados in 1975. The Queen's representative, the Governor-General of Barbados, had their own standard.

The Queen's standard consisted of a yellow field with a bearded fig tree, a long-established symbol of the island of Barbados, and the national flower the Pride of Barbados flowers in each of the upper corners. A blue disc of the letter "E" crowned surrounded by a garland of gold roses is displayed prominently on the flag within the centre of the tree. The disc is taken from the Queen's Personal Flag.

See also
 Royal Standard of the United Kingdom, for a full list of all of Queen Elizabeth II's flags
 National symbols of Barbados
 List of Barbados flags

References

External links
 Queen Elizabeth II's Personal Standard in Barbados at Flags of the World. Accessed 16 Jan 07.

Monarchy of Barbados
Flags of Barbados
Barbados
Politics of Barbados